Halozyme Therapeutics is an American biotechnology company that develops novel oncology therapies designed to target the tumor microenvironment and licenses a novel drug delivery technology through corporate partnerships.

The company was founded in 1998 and went public in 2004. Halozyme is headquartered in San Diego, California.

Company history
Halozyme's business is primarily focused on its proprietary and patented recombinant human hyaluronidase enzyme, rHuPH20. The company's development pipeline is concentrated in clinical stage and pre-clinical stage oncology products, including its proprietary investigational drug, PEGPH20, a pegylated version of rHuPH20, which targets hyaluronan (HA) high tumors. The company is in various phases of clinical trials with PEGPH20 across multiple solid tumor types, including pancreatic cancer, non-small cell lung cancer (NSCLC), and gastric cancer, to test the drug's safety and efficacy. Halozyme has one FDA approved product (Hylenex recombinant, hyaluronidase human injection). The company also licenses its drug delivery technology Enhanze to other biopharmaceutical companies, including Roche, Baxalta, Pfizer, Janssen, AbbVie, and Lilly.

Company leadership
Since January 2014, Dr. Helen I. Torley, M.B. Ch. B., M.R.C.P. has been Chief Executive Officer and President of Halozyme Therapeutics, Inc. Prior to her role at Halozyme, she was Chief Commercial Officer at Onyx Pharmaceuticals, Inc., and also served in senior level management positions at Amgen and Bristol-Myers Squibb. She began her career at Novartis in 1990 and spent 7 years there, with her final role as Vice President of Medical Affairs.

Approved products
Hylenex: Approved by the U.S. Food and Drug Administration (FDA) on 12/02/2005. Hylenex is a hyaluronidase (human recombinant) injection indicated for use in subcutaneous  fluid administration, dispersion and absorption of injected drugs, and subcutaneous urography.

Technology

Enhanze: Uses recombinant human hyaluronidase to degrade HA and aids in the absorption and dispersion of co-administered injected drugs. Halozyme licenses its Enhanze drug delivery platform technology to other biopharmaceutical companies to enable intravenous to subcutaneous administration conversion and dose optimization.

Product candidates

PEGPH20: A PEGylated drug candidate based on Halozyme's proprietary rHuPH20 enzyme (a recombinant human hyaluronidase enzyme). It breaks down or depletes hyaluronan (HA), which can build up in certain tumors. The goal of PEGPH20 is to break down HA so that some anti-cancer therapies and activated immune cells can better reach the cancer cells of HA-high tumors.  On November 4, 2019, Halozyme announced it has halted development of PEGPH20.

Pipeline candidates 

PEG-ADA2: An engineered human recombinant enzyme, adenosine deaminase 2, for decreasing the concentration of immune-suppressive adenosine in the tumor microenvironment, and PEGylated to prolong its circulation in the body. It has been tested in colon, lung, and pancreatic cancer models in preclinical studies.

HTI-1511 Anti-EGFR ADC: An antibody-drug conjugate (ADC) with a strong cytotoxin, monomethyl auristatin E, designed to treat EGFR-positive tumors, including those with KRAS and BRAF mutations. It has been tested in colon, lung, and cholangiocarcinoma models in preclinical studies.

Clinical trial pipeline 

Halozyme has many ongoing and completed clinical trials testing the safety and efficacy of its primary investigational drug, PEGPH20, in combination with other therapies, with the goal of finding new treatments for pancreatic cancer, NSCLC, gastric cancer, breast cancer, and others. As of October 2016, the company was sponsoring or collaborating on several clinical trials that were recruiting patients, including:

 HALO Pancreatic 301 – A Phase 3 study to test the efficacy and safety of a combination of PEGPH20 with Abraxane (nab-paclitaxel) and gemcitabine in participants with previously untreated HA-high stage IV pancreatic cancer. On November 4, 2019, Halozyme announced it has halted development of PEGPH20.
 HALO Lung / Gastric 101 – A Phase 1b study to test the efficacy and safety of a combination of PEGPH20 and Keytruda (pembrolizumab) in participants with relapsed/refractory advanced or metastatic NSCLC and relapsed/refractory locally advanced or metastatic gastric adenocarcinoma.
 A Phase 1b study to test the efficacy and safety of a combination of PEGPH20 with Halaven (eribulin) in participants with human epidermal growth factor receptor 2 (HER2)-negative, HA-high metastatic breast cancer (MBC).

References

External links
 

Biotechnology companies of the United States
Companies based in San Diego
Pharmaceutical companies established in 1998
2004 initial public offerings
Companies listed on the Nasdaq